Sepiola steenstrupiana, also known as Steenstrup's bobtail, is a species of bobtail squid native to the Gulf of Aden in the Red Sea, waters off Somalia, and the Mediterranean Sea, including the central Tyrrhenian Sea, the Adriatic Sea, the Aegean Sea, and the Levantine Sea.

S. steenstrupiana grows to 30 mm in mantle length.

The type locality is given simply as "Villafranca". It is unknown where the type specimen is deposited. The species is named in honour of the Danish zoologist Japetus Steenstrup.

References

External links

Bobtail squid
Molluscs of the Mediterranean Sea
Fauna of the Red Sea
Marine molluscs of Africa
Marine molluscs of Europe
Cephalopods of Europe